Sir Henry Holland, 1st Baronet, FRS (27 October 1788 – 27 October 1873) was a British physician and travel writer.

Early life
Born in Knutsford, Cheshire, Holland was the son of the physician Peter Holland (1766–1853) and his wife Mary Willets. Peter's sister Elizabeth was the mother of the novelist Elizabeth Gaskell, and Mary was the niece of the potter Josiah Wedgwood. He studied medicine at Edinburgh University (MA, 1811).

Career
He had an extensive practice and was Domestic Physician to Caroline, Princess of Wales (briefly in 1814) and Physician Extraordinary to William IV and to Queen Victoria. He was also Physician in Ordinary to Queen Victoria in 1852.  He was elected a Fellow of the Royal Society in January, 1815 and served on the council three times. He was created a Baronet in 1853.

Scientifically, Holland made an early contribution to the Germ theory of disease in his essay "On the hypothesis of insect life as a cause of disease?" in "Medical Notes and Reflections", 1839.

Travel
Holland gained fame through his travel writings, having travelled to Iceland and through the Balkans and the Iberian peninsula, while the British were at war with France.  He was also a talented society physician, and between his good looks, his charm, and his experiences and conversation, he was much in demand.

On 4 December 1836 Holland attended a party hosted by Fanny and Hensleigh Wedgwood for their relatives, shortly after Charles Darwin returned from the Beagle voyage. Darwin had sent home packets of his "journal", and he asked his relatives about captain FitzRoy's intent of incorporating it into the published Narrative. Holland "looked over a few pages, and evidently thought that it would not be worth while to publish it alone, as it would be partly going over the same ground with the Captain." Darwin thought the "little Dr talked much good sense", but Emma Wedgwood did not think Holland "any judge as to what is amusing or interesting", and Hensleigh felt if Holland "thought it would not do for publication it only affects my opinion of his taste & not the least in the world the merits of the thing itself". Darwin's Journal and Remarks became well known as The Voyage of the Beagle.

Holland died on his 85th birthday, 27 October 1873, at his house in Brook Street, London.

Family
In 1822 he married, Margaret Emma Caldwell (1795–1830, known as Emma), with whom he had two sons and two daughters:
 Henry Holland, 1st Viscount Knutsford (1825–1914)
 Francis James Holland (1828–1907)
 Emily Mary Holland (1824–1908) married Charles Buxton; their son was Sydney Buxton, 1st Earl Buxton
 Elinor Anne Holland (1826–1829)

Emma died on 2 February 1830.  He later became son-in-law to the wit Sydney Smith whose daughter, Saba, he married as his second wife, with whom he had two daughters:
 Caroline Holland (1834–1909), author of Notebooks of a Spinster Lady, publ. posth. 1919
 Gertrude Holland (1840–1898)

Arms

References

External links 
 
 Recollections of Past Life By Sir Henry Holland
 Travels in the Ionian Isles, Albania, Thessaly, Macedonia, &c. During the Years 1812-1813. By Sir Henry Holland

 

1788 births
1873 deaths
People from Knutsford
19th-century English medical doctors
English travel writers
Baronets in the Baronetage of the United Kingdom
Fellows of the Royal Society
Alumni of the University of Edinburgh
Physicians-in-Ordinary